There was no defending champion as the 2016 edition was abandoned due to the 2016 Turkish coup d'état attempt.

Sofya Zhuk won the title, defeating İpek Soylu in the final, 4–6, 6–3, 7–6(7–5).

Seeds

Draw

Finals

Top half

Bottom half

References
Main Draw

Bursa Cup - Singles
Bursa Cup